Elizabeth Alden Curtis Holman (August 12, 1879 - ?) of Waterville, Maine was the plaintiff in a 1914 United States Federal Court ruling on forced institutionalization.

Biography
She was born on August 12, 1879 in Hartford, Connecticut, and was the niece of U.S. Attorney General John W. Griggs.

In 1912 she was committed involuntarily to the Brattleboro Insane Asylum by her husband and physicians. 

In 1914 she sought $50,000 in damages for her abduction against by two Hartford, Connecticut physicians and her former husband, the Rev. Cranston Brenton of Yonkers, New York. He was head of the Social Service Commission of the Protestant Episcopal Church in New York State. At trial the long time superintendent of the Brattleboro Retreat, Dr. Shaller E. Lawton, testified that Holman was "morally and mentally impaired." However, lawyers produced documents from the divorce proceedings of Reverend Brenton that contradicted the statements of Lawton, creating shock in the courtroom.

She won $4,000 in damages.

She married Frederic Ernest Holman.

Writing

Elizabeth Alden Curtis Holman was also a writer, publishing under various names depending on her marital status. In 1900, she's mentioned in a The Nation magazine article as an American poet working on a "thoughtful, pure, and even pleasing" version of the Rubaiyat. As "Elizabeth Curtis Brenton," she had letters that appeared in The New York Times  Saturday Review of Books in 1901 and 1905. In 1902 she published a version of The Lament of Baba Tahir, a Persian text, under the name Elizabeth Curtis Brenton; in 1912, E. A. Curtis and F. E. Holman (not yet married) filed for copyright for a play she wrote, based on Alice in Wonderland. Also in 1912, she published a play called "The Norseman." She also published poetry in the Connecticut Magazine, The Crisis, and other literary periodicals.

Bibliography
 Bābā-Ṭāhir, Edward Heron-Allen, and Elizabeth A. Curtis. The Lament of Baba Tahir: Being the Ruba'iyat of Baba Tahir, Hamadani ('uryan) the Persian Text Ed., Annotated and Tr. by Edward Heron-Allen, and Rendered into English Verse by Elizabeth Curtis Brenton. London: B. Quaritch, 1902. 
 Curtis, Elizabeth A. The Norseman; a Drama in Four Acts, by Elizabeth Alden Curtis. Portland, Me., The Mosher Press, 1912. 
 Omar, Khayyam, and Elizabeth A. Curtis. One Hundred Quatrains from the Rubáiyát of Omar Khayyám: A Rendering in English Verse. Gouverneur, N.Y: Brothers of the Book, 1899.

References

External links
 
 

1879 births
Year of death missing
People from Hartford, Connecticut
People from Waterville, Maine